Pt. Arup Chattopadhyay is an Indian tabla player. He was born at Chandannagar, West Bengal. He started learning tabla at the age of six from his father Pt. Pankaj Chattopadhyay, who himself is a tabla player of Bengal. After a few years, he came under the tutelage of world-famous tabla maestro Pandit Sankar Ghosh of Farukkhabad gharana with whom he continues to learn. Gradually he has established himself as a top class accompanist and a formidable soloist. His performances are admired for their tonal quality, crystal clear sound of bols (tabla syllables) even at an electrifying speed, and tremendous sense of rhythm and melody. He was awarded the top-grade by All India Radio and Television (All India Radio and Doordarshan). His performances with most of the leading artists like Pandit Ravi Shankar, Ustad Ashish Khan, Ustad Shahid Parvez, Ustad Rais Khan, Pandit Rajan and Sajan Mishra, Pandit Ajoy Chakraborty, Pandit Manas Chakraborty, Pandit Viswamohan Bhat, Ustad Rashid khan, Pandit Tejendra Narayan Majumder, Pandit Nayan Ghosh and Pandit Kushal Das among others, has established him as a top-notch accompanist throughout the world. Since 1998, he has been honored to accompany the living legend Pt. Ravi Shankar  in his tours throughout the U.S., Canada, Europe and India. He accompanied Pt. Deepak Chowdhury in his U.K. tour, and Pandit Kartick Seshadri in his U.S., Canada, Australia and Mexico tours. He is also a highly accomplished tabla teacher and was a professor of tabla at Bharatiya Vidya Bhavan in London. Since 1998 he has been a visiting lecturer of tabla at the University of California, San Diego.

References 

Indian male classical musicians
Living people
Tabla players
Year of birth missing (living people)